Bhagal is an area located in Surat, India. It is one of the oldest junctions of Surat dating back to british era. Roads coming from Chowk Bazaar, Railway Station, Mahidharpura, Rani Talav and Navsari Bazaar meet here.
It is the centre of the actual Surat.

See also 
List of tourist attractions in Surat

Suburban area of Surat
Neighbourhoods in Surat